¡Ala... Dina! is a Spanish television sitcom that was broadcast on La Primera Cadena of Televisión Española from January 4, 2000 to December 25, 2002.

The series follows the story of Dina, a genie who after 400 years locked in a magic lamp, is released by the family of Tomás and she is hired as a housekeeper.

Plot 
The story begins when the young son of the widower Tomás, Álvaro, finds a magic lamp. After rubbing it, the lamp releases the genie. The genie calling herself as Dina, has been over 500 years locked up there, waiting for someone to be released. Dina is then integrated into the family of Tomás, getting a job as a housekeeper in the home, cleaning, cooking and caring for Álvaro and Eva, the two children of Tomás.

When Tomás discovers the powers of Dina, he prohibits its use. Nevertheless, Dina uses her supernatural abilities at every opportunity.

Technical and artistic data 
The series is based on an original idea of Paco Arango. It was directed by José Pavón and Rafael de la Cueva, and produced by Cartel for Televisión Española.

It was premiered on 4 January 2000, and it was the most watched television program in Spain on its opening day, with 4,9 million viewers and a 27.8% of audience share.

The series stopped airing on December 25 of 2002.

The actress Paz Padilla remained in the cast until the episode aired on May 14, 2001. Then she would be replaced for the same role by Miriam Díaz Aroca.

Paz Padilla was nominated for Best Actress at ATV Awards 2000.

Main cast and characters
 Dina (Paz Padilla/Miriam Díaz Aroca)
 Tomás (Gary Piquer)
 Eva (Lidia San José)
 Álvaro (José Gonzálvez)
 Lucrecia (Mary Carmen Ramírez)
 José María "Chemita" (Darío Paso)
 Paloma Velázquez (Verónica Mengod)
 Sazhim (Santiago Urrialde)
 Rogelio (Alfonso Vallejo)
 Rashid (Eduardo MacGregor)
 Sandra (Sandra Gómez)
 Bolita (Alejandro Rello)
 Rosi (Nathalie Seseña)

Guest Starring:

 Chiquito de la Alcazaba (Chiquito de la Calzada)
 Gina (Ana García Obregón)
 Teresa (Asunción Balaguer)
 Mayra Gómez Kemp
 David Civera
 Doña Francisca (Paloma Cela)
 Kruger (Michael Reckling)
 Gino (Alessandro Lecquio)
 Lorenzo Milá
 Pizza delivery guy (Miguel Ángel Muñoz)
 Francisco
 Carlos Baute
 Zoltán (Mariano Alameda)
 Mustapha (Rappel)
 Soraya (Elisenda Rivas)
 Juan Camus
 Empress Igartíbula (Anne Igartiburu)

References 

La 1 (Spanish TV channel) network series
Spanish television sitcoms
2000 Spanish television series debuts
2002 Spanish television series endings
2000s Spanish comedy television series
Spanish fantasy television series